The Matrix Revolutions: Music from the Motion Picture is a 2003 soundtrack album from the  film, The Matrix Revolutions.

Track listing
 "The Matrix Revolutions Main Title" by Don Davis – 1:21
 "The Trainman Cometh" by Juno Reactor/Don Davis – 2:43
 "Tetsujin" (iron man) by Juno Reactor/Don Davis – 3:21
 "In My Head" by Pale 3 – 3:46
 "The Road to Sourceville" by Don Davis – 1:25
 "Men in Metal" by Don Davis – 2:18
 "Niobe's Run" by Don Davis – 2:48
 "Woman Can Drive" by Don Davis – 2:41
 "Moribund Mifune" by Don Davis – 3:47
 "Kidfried" by Don Davis – 4:49
 "Saw Bitch Workhorse" by Don Davis – 3:59
 "Trinity Definitely" by Don Davis – 4:15
 "Neodämmerung" (Neo's dusk) by Don Davis – 5:59
 "Why, Mr. Anderson?" by Don Davis – 6:10
 "Spirit of the Universe" by Don Davis – 4:51
 "Navras" by Juno Reactor vs. Don Davis – 9:08

The track "Navras" was used by rhythmic gymnasts Simona Peycheva of Bulgaria and Penelope Blackmore of Australia in their respective ribbon routines at the 2004 Athens Olympic Games.

References

External links

The Matrix (franchise) albums
2003 soundtrack albums
2000s film soundtrack albums
Maverick Records soundtracks
Warner Records soundtracks
Film scores
Don Davis (composer) soundtracks